Dores is a village located on the east shore of Loch Ness, 10 km south west of the city of Inverness, in the Highland council area of Scotland. The now defunct RockNess music festival used to take place in fields to the north of the village.

References

Populated places in Inverness committee area
RockNess
Loch Ness